Sretenovo is a village in the municipality of Dojran, North Macedonia. It is located on the south shores of Doiran Lake, near the Greek border.

Demographics
As of the 2021 census, Sretenovo had 344 residents with the following ethnic composition:
Macedonians 246
Serbs 43
Roma 19
Others 13
Albanians 10
Turks 8
Persons for whom data are taken from administrative sources 5

According to the 2002 census, the village had a total of 315 inhabitants. Ethnic groups in the village include:
Macedonians 205
Turks 11
Serbs 54
Romani 36
Aromanians 1
Others 8

References

Villages in Dojran Municipality